Kizhakke Varum Paattu is a 1993 Indian Tamil-language romance film directed by Radha Bharathi starring Prashanth and Charmila. The music was composed by Deva.

Plot

The story is about Moorthy (Prashanth), who comes to his native place. He meets the village headman's daughter Kanmani (Charmila) and they get bonded with each other. Their acquaintance blossoms into an inseparable affair of love and life. The elder brother Ponnambalam of Kanmani, who returns from jail opposes their marriage. The story carries a flashback of Moorthy's father. Subsequently, many untoward incidents takes place with a lot of twists and turns. Moorthy withstands the turmoil and succeeds in seeking the hand of Kanmani and the movie ends on a happy note.

Cast

Prashanth as Moorthy
Charmila as Kanmani
M. N. Nambiar
Srividya
Sathyapriya
Janagaraj
Ponnambalam as Kanmani's brother
Manya

Soundtrack

The film score and the soundtrack were composed by Deva.

Tamil version 

Lyrics were written by Kalidasan and Ravi Bharathi.

Telugu version 

This film was dubbed into Telugu as Allari Bullodu. All lyrics were written by Rajasri.

References

1992 films
1990s Tamil-language films
Indian romance films
Films directed by Radha Bharathi
1990s romance films